Austrian Airlines AG, often shortened to Austrian, is the flag carrier of Austria and a subsidiary of the Lufthansa Group. The airline is headquartered on the grounds of Vienna International Airport in Schwechat where it also maintains its hub. As of July 2016, the airline flew to six domestic and more than 120 international year-round and seasonal destinations in 55 countries and is a member of the Star Alliance.

The airline was formed in 1957 by the merger of Air Austria and Austrian Airways, but traces its history back to 1923 at the founding of Austrian Airways. Throughout much of the company's existence, it was a state-owned entity. On 31 March 1958, the airline performed its scheduled service, flying a leased Vickers Viscount from Vienna to Zurich and London; it subsequently purchased its own Viscount fleet. On 18 February 1963, Austrian ordered its first jet-powered airliner, the Sud Aviation Caravelle. It subsequently introduced various models and derivatives of the Douglas DC-9 jetliner; by the end of 1971, Austrian was an all-jet operator. During the 1980s, it introduced the DC-9-80, otherwise known as the McDonnell Douglas MD-80, to its fleet. Various airliners produced by Airbus, Boeing, Fokker and other manufacturers were introduced across the 1980s and 1990s.

Throughout the 1990s, the airline sought out new strategic alliances, as well to expand its presence in the long-haul market, launching new services to China and South Africa. In 2000, Austrian became a member of Star Alliance; a few years prior, it had also joined the Qualiflyer Group. During the 2000s, the airline expanded through the acquisitions of Rheintalflug and Lauda Air and adopted the shortened Austrian name in 2003. Throughout the 2000s, Austrian sustained several years of losses; during 2008, the airline's then-owner, the Austrian government, was advised to privatise Austrian via its sale to a foreign company. During 2009, the Lufthansa Group purchased Austrian after receiving approval from the European Commission following an investigation into the tendering process.

Following its privatisation, both fleet expansion and cost-saving initiatives were enacted as the business was restructured; visible changes included route alterations, a new corporate design, and a revised aircraft livery. Following labour disputes over several of the cost cutting measures, all Austrian Airlines' flights were transferred on 1 July 2012 to its subsidiary, Tyrolean Airways, which operated under the Austrian name. On 1 April 2015, after a new labour agreement had been reached, all flights transferred back to Austrian, and Tyrolean Airways was merged into its parent. During the late 2010s, restructuring of both its fleet and route network continued. On 17 March 2020, the airline temporarily suspended operations as a result of the COVID-19 outbreak.

History

Early years 
On 3 May 1923, Walter Barda-Bardenau received approval by the Austrian government for establishing an airline. He participated in the newly formed Austrian Airlines (German: Österreichische Luftverkehrs AG) with one percent, with the remaining shares going to the Austrian railway transportation company (50%) and the Junkers-Werke (49%).

The company's initial fleet consisted of Junkers F 13s. On 14 May 1923, the first flight performed by the fledging airline was conducted between Vienna and Munich, piloted by Hans Baur. The landing took place in Vienna Jedlesee; there occurred a conversion to float and the connecting flight to Budapest. The company was operated by Junkers Trans European Union. Its destinations included Munich, Budapest, Nuremberg, Graz, Klagenfurt, and St. Wolfgang. Some targets in Austria were served with seaplanes. The union was dissolved in September 1926.

From 1927, the company procured new aircraft with support from the government. During the same year, it formed an operating partnership agreement with Deutsche Luft Hansa. Line connections were planned and operated jointly by the two companies, while a route network to Berlin, Budapest, and Milan Vienna was created. In 1932, Luft Hansa Junkers held a 49% interest in the company. After recovering from the global economic fallout from the Great Depression, the firm's fleet was expanded via the addition of several Junkers Ju 52/3 m. The rapid growth of the firm throughout the 1930s led to it becoming the fourth-largest airline in Europe at one point.

In 1938, the company began planning routes to Rome, Paris, and London, using a fleet of Junkers Ju 90 aircraft. Following the annexation of Austria by Nazi Germany in March 1938, these plans were promptly abandoned. From 1 January 1939, the airline was fully under the control of Lufthansa. During June 1939, the company was deleted from the commercial register.

After the Second World War, Austria was once again separated from Germany. While it regained its independence as a result of the Austrian State Treaty of 1955, the newly reconstituted nation was initially lacking a national airline. During 1955, two separate companies, Air Austria and Austrian Airways, were quickly established to start filling this vacant niche. On 4 April 1957, Austrian Airlines was formed under the corporate name Österreichische Luftverkehrs AG through the merger of Air Austria and Austrian Airways. On 30 September 1957, the new entity commenced operations, performing its maiden flight on 31 March 1958 when a leased Vickers Viscount 779 took off from Vienna for a scheduled service to Zurich and London.

During early 1960, six new-build Viscount 837s were delivered to Austrian Airlines; unlike earlier aircraft, which had been leased, these were owned by the company and quickly displaced the former. Operations expanded quickly, opting to launch domestic services for the first time on 1 May 1963. Within ten years of operations, Austrian Airlines' financial situation had improved considerably; its share capital had reportedly increased from an initial ATS 60 million to reach ATS 290 million in 1957.

Jet era
During its first decade of operation, Austrian Airlines experienced competition from Adria Airways; passengers from the Austrian provinces of Styria and Carinthia were routinely commuting to neighbouring Yugoslavia to use airports in what is now Slovenia. On 18 February 1963, Austrian ordered its first jet airliner, the Sud Aviation Caravelle, which it operated in an 80-seat configuration. During 1969, the airline broke new ground with the launch of its first long-distance route to New York City in the United States (early flights were made in co-operation with Belgian Sabena with a layover in Brussels).

The Caravelle formed a core part of Austrian Airlines' fleet up until 1973. Deliveries of the American-built jetliner, the Douglas DC-9, commenced during 1971. Starting in 1971, Austrian opted to standardise its fleet. By the end of that year, all Viscounts had been permanently withdrawn, leaving the firm with an all-jet fleet. Its new fleet centered around a core of nine DC-9-32s, these would be operated by Austrian Airlines for both short- and medium-haul flights for many years. During 1975, the first of five DC-9-51s, an improved model, was introduced to service.

On 13 October 1977, Austrian became the first customer for the DC-9-80, otherwise known as the McDonnell Douglas MD-80, having placed an initial order for eight. On 26 October 1980, the first MD-81, which was capable of longer-range flights than earlier models, made its first commercial flight with the airline, flying from Vienna to Zurich. During 1984, Austrian became the first customer for the MD-87 and played an influential role in its development. The first MD-87 entered service at the end of 1987, as did the MD-83 from 1990, while six of the airline's MD-81s were upgraded to MD-82 standards.

During 1988, Austrian Airlines underwent an initial public offering upon the Vienna Stock Exchange, although the majority of shares in the company remained held by the Austrian government at this time.

Developments from 1990 to 2008 
Throughout the 1990s, many airlines focused on co-operation and alliances. Austrian was one of the first companies to join the Qualiflyer Group, founded by Swissair. This was also a period of quick expansion in the long-haul market, launching new flight paths to China and South Africa. During the late 1990s, Austrian Airlines developed an appetite for acquisitions; during March 1997, it bought a 35 percent stake in Lauda Air while an 85.7 percent shareholding in Tyrolean Airways was acquired in December of that year. Two years later, the airline wholly acquired Tyrolean Airways, making it a subsidiary During 1999, Austrian Airlines launched the ability for customers to book flights via the internet.

On 26 March 2000, Austrian became a member of Star Alliance. During January 2001, it acquired a majority of the shares in Lauda Air; one month later, the airline also bought all of the shares in Rheintalflug. Austrian Airlines' operating name was shortened to Austrian in September 2003, it also renamed its three constituent carriers during this rebranding. On 1 October 2004, the flight operations departments of Austrian and Lauda Air were merged into a single unit, leaving Lauda Air as a brand name only for charter flights. It had 6,394 employees. Another subsidiary of Austrian Airlines, Tyrolean Airways, specialised in regional flights, having been merged with Rheintalflug during 2002. During March 2004, it launched its Focus East plan, expanding the airline's destinations across Central and Eastern Europe to 38; as a consequence, the Austrian Airlines Group became a market leader within this region.

In October 2006, Austrian was forced to adopt a stringent cost-saving policy, and in 2007, it eliminated over 500 jobs. Many long-haul destinations were cancelled, such as Sydney via Kuala Lumpur, Melbourne via Singapore, Kathmandu or Shanghai. Three remaining Fokker 70s were sent to Tyrolean Airways. It was also decided to abandon the long-haul Airbus planes, consisting of four Airbus A340s and four Airbus A330s, to standardise the fleet in favour of Boeing 777s and Boeing 767s. Austrian Airlines removed complimentary in-flight meals and alcoholic drinks on short-haul services, introducing what was called a "Self Select Bistro Service", except on flights from London and any flights above 100 minutes in duration. Head office moved from Oberlaa to Vienna Airport in 2007, whereas headquarters remained in Vienna.

After recording a small profit of €3.3 million in 2007, financial guidance for 2008 had to be changed negatively several times, to a loss of €475 million expected as of the end of November.

Takeover by Lufthansa 
In June 2008, Merrill Lynch advised the Austrian government to sell the airline to a foreign company. Interest was shown by Lufthansa, Air France–KLM, Royal Jordanian, Air China, Turkish Airlines, Aeroflot, S7 Airlines, and Singapore Airlines. Of those, Lufthansa, Air France-KLM, and S7 emerged as potential bidders.

On 13 November 2008, state holding ÖIAG announced that Lufthansa was selected. The German company was to enter Austrian's capital with a 41.6% share, for which it would pay €366,268.75. AUA CEO Alfred Ötsch and OIAG chairman Peter Michaelis were heavily criticised for revealing to Lufthansa that it had to take over the €500 million debt only when the deal had been made binding. Michaelis refused a new tendering procedure, but was made a scapegoat with his shareholder rights removed, and Ötsch resigned on 29 January 2013.

On 1 July 2009, the European Commission initiated investigation on the acquisition for breach of free-trade rules, suspecting that the tendering process was a fake one, everything being already decided in favour of Lufthansa. Finally, following approval from the European Commission, Lufthansa purchased Austrian Airlines during September 2009. Shares in Austrian Airlines AG were suspended on the Vienna Stock Exchange on 4 February 2010. After a time of uncertainty following the demission of appointed CEO Thierry Antinori, the arrival of Jaan Albrecht as the new CEO in 2011 signalled the beginning of a new era for the airline, with improving passenger numbers and a more strategic position within the Lufthansa framework. The completion of extension works at the Vienna International Airport will give the airline more room for expansion. As a result, in January 2012, a new strategy was implemented, with the addition of 11 new aircraft in the next three years, leading to a renewal of the fleet on the long term, with Airbus planes serving medium-haul routes and Boeings serving long-haul routes.

During December 2011, a new cost-saving plan was revealed, as the company was still losing money despite eliminating 2,500 jobs. Lufthansa refused to provide financial support. In March 2012, Austrian called once more for recapitalisation. Lufthansa approved a capital increase of €140 million, providing effective measure to be taken to address the structural deficiencies.

The Lauda Air subsidiary was merged into Austrian Airlines on 1 July 2012.

Operational transition to Tyrolean from 2012
On 30 April 2012, after failure of negotiations over cost-cutting measures, AUA operations were taken over by subsidiary Tyrolean Airways. After this date, all Austrian flights were operated by Tyrolean. However, 110 pilots and 250 flight personnel chose not to go to Tyrolean, but to instead leave the group.

During April 2013, Austrian Airlines retired its final Boeing 737, a 737-800 variant in Lauda Air markings, as part of its fleet-consolidation exercise. The airline's 11 Boeing 737s were replaced by seven Airbus A320s, it was reportedly expected to achieve annual saving of €17 million through the move to a single type. In March 2014, it was announced that Austrian had returned to profitability for the first time in six years. This same year, management intensified efforts to end a long-running labour dispute.

Merger of Austrian and Tyrolean in 2015
In October 2014, it was announced that Tyrolean's flight operations and staff were to be reintegrated into Austrian Airlines by 31 March 2015, this move was a consequence of a new labour agreement having been recently reached.

Ahead of this merger, Austrian announced an overhauled concept, initially called "my Austrian", on 26 March 2015; it included a new corporate design, a revised aircraft livery, and a number of new routes. However, in January 2016, Austrian Airlines announced it would revise its new branding introduced in spring 2015 by dropping the word "my" in front of Austrian; this new feature had been severely criticised.

In June 2015, Austrian Airlines announced the purchase of 17 Embraer 195s from within the Lufthansa Group. These Embraer aircraft, which had been owned by Lufthansa CityLine, replaced the ageing Fokker 70s and 100s. By August 2016, eight of 17 Embraer aircraft had been delivered while 9 of 23 Fokker left the fleet. By late July 2017, all of the remaining Fokker 70s had been phased out; the Fokker 100s followed by the end of the year. That same year, Austrian began offering Internet on board its short-haul and medium-haul flights for the first time.

Due to increasing competition from low-cost carriers at its Vienna base and the need to streamline operations to avoid financial losses, in 2019, the airline announced a restructuring to its fleet and network. All Bombardier Q400 turboprop aircraft are being replaced with Airbus A320s by March 2021, with all crew bases outside of Vienna shut down and routes not going through Vienna airport moved to either Lufthansa or Eurowings. In January 2020, Austrian announced the further retirement of three of its six Boeing 767-300ER long-haul aircraft scheduled, the last of which will leave the fleet by fall 2021. It has yet to be determined if and when they will be replaced by other aircraft, with the Boeing 787 Dreamliner a possible replacement.

Austrian suspended all regularly scheduled flights between 18 March and 15 June 2020 as global air traffic collapsed due to the COVID-19 pandemic. With regular operations suspended, the airline carried out several repatriation flights to carry home Austrians stranded abroad, as well as freight flights to carry medical supplies. Such flights were launched to Abuja, Bali, Lima, Mexico City, and Sydney. In summer 2020, the airline received €600 million in financial aid from Lufthansa and the Austrian government to help it weather the pandemic; in return, Austrian committed to, among others, reducing  emissions in Austria by 50% by 2030. Overall, the airline ended 2020 flying 3.1 million passengers, a 79% drop from the prior year.

In September 2021, it has been announced that Austrian Airlines will terminate all of its remaining scheduled services originating from Austrian airports outside of Vienna. These will be either cancelled or transferred to sister company Eurowings.

In December 2022, the Lufthansa Group announced negotiations to replace Austrian's entire long-haul fleet with Boeing 787s by the end of the 2020s.

Corporate affairs

Ownership and subsidiaries
Austrian Airlines Group is wholly owned by Lufthansa. Austrian owns shares in 24 companies, including:
 Austrian Technik Bratislava, a maintenance company located at Bratislava Airport equipped for overhauls on Fokker and Embraer regional jets, Airbus A220 and the Airbus A320 family.
 Gulet-Touropa-Touristik
 AVS-Versicherungen
 TUI Austria
 Traviaustria
 AirPlus Kreditkarteninstitut
 Wiener Börse AG
 SCA Schedule Coordination Austria
 ACS AirContainerService GmbH
 Avicon Aviation Consult GmbH
 Austrian Lufthansa Cargo GmbH
 Austrian Airlines Tele Sales & Service GmbH

Business trends
Until 2008, full detailed accounts for Austrian Airlines were published in their annual reports; following the takeover by Lufthansa, only summary information for Austrian is now made available, usually by way of press release. Figures for years ending 31 December are:

Livery 

Citing the colours of the national flag of Austria, Austrian Airlines' colour scheme has always been a pattern of red, white, and red. Aircraft bellies were silver from the 1950s to 1980s, the upper part was white with the Austrian Airlines arrow and the text "Austrian Airlines" (until 1972, again from 1995 to 2003) or "Austrian" (1972–1995, from 2003 onwards). Austrian Airlines' slogan was "the friendly airline" at the time. As part of the 2015 rebranding, the blue belly and engine painting of the livery were replaced by white and red.

The Austrian Airlines' arrow ("Austrian Chevron") has seen several design modifications over the years. When created in 1960 it was redolent of the shape of a flying bird; the design became more formal in 1972. As part of a rebranding exercise in 1995, the "Chevron" was placed on the red-white-red tail fin. In the new corporate design, in use since 2003, the old "Chevron" shape was used again, this time in a more modern style and with a drop shadow placed underneath.

Several special colour schemes have been used throughout the decades. Since joining Star Alliance, a few aeroplanes have flown with Star Alliance markings. For the Mozart year in 2006, an Airbus A320 was decorated in a Mozart design, and an Airbus A340-300 was coated with an hommage to the Vienna Philharmonic orchestra. A Boeing 737-600 was given a glacier look for a Tyrol advertisement. Three designs were put on aeroplanes to mark Euro 2008. An Airbus A320 was given a retro livery to mark the company's 50th anniversary. Austrian's slogan is "the charming way to fly".

Destinations

Route development
In 2006, Austrian decided to retire its A330 and A340 fleet, which consisted of four Airbus A330-200s, two Airbus A340-200s, and two Airbus A340-300s. These aircraft were sold to TAP Air Portugal, the French Air Force, and SWISS respectively. As a result of having less long-haul capacity, Austrian suspended some of its long-haul flights to East Asia. Flights to Shanghai (resumed 2016), Phuket, Colombo, Mauritius (resumed in 2014), Malé, and Kathmandu ended in 2007.

Both Australia routes - Melbourne via Singapore and Sydney via Kuala Lumpur - were terminated in March 2007, ending operations on the Kangaroo Route. Austrian was the last European-based airline offering direct flights from Melbourne to Europe. It started with Lauda aircraft, and later used Austrian Airlines aircraft. Austrian has temporarily restarted the Vienna to Sydney route in March 2020, as part of their repatriation flights to retrieve people stranded in other countries during the COVID-19 pandemic. The flight from Vienna to Sydney will be non-stop and the return flight will make a stopover in Penang, Malaysia to refuel and onload additional cargo. Using a Boeing 777, the non-stop flight will cover a distance of over 16,000 kilometers or 9,940 miles and it will last almost 18 hours, making it the longest flight in the history of Austrian Airlines.

Austrian was one of the few airlines to fly to post-war Iraq when it began flights to Erbil in December 2006.
New flights to Mumbai began in November 2010 and Austrian resumed flights to Baghdad on 8 June 2011. On 13 January 2013, Austrian Airlines suspended flights to Tehran due to a lack of demand. Austrian Airlines resumed flights to Chicago on 17 May 2013, and launched Newark in 2014. Austrian Airlines started service to Mauritius in the beginning of the 2015 winter schedule. The expansion of the intercontinental network seems to indicate improving results for Austrian, with Lufthansa placing its confidence in the airline. Austrian Airlines began service to Mauritius and Miami in October 2015. Austrian Airlines commenced service to Los Angeles on 10 April 2017, covering a distance of over 9,877 kilometers or 6,137 miles; the flight takes about 12 hours and 30 minutes, using Boeing 777-200ER aircraft. Austrian Airlines announced it would commence service (four times a week) to Shiraz which began on 2 July 2017, with a stopover in Isfahan using Airbus A320 aircraft.

Codeshare agreement
Austrian Airlines codeshares with the following airlines:

 airBaltic
 Air Canada
 Air China
 Air France
 Air India
 Air Malta
 All Nippon Airways
 Asiana Airlines
 Azerbaijan Airlines
 Bangkok Airways
 Belavia
 Brussels Airlines
 Cathay Pacific
 Croatia Airlines
 Egyptair
 Ethiopian Airlines
 Eurowings
 Georgian Airways
 Iran Air
 ITA Airways
 LOT Polish Airlines
 Lufthansa
 Luxair
 Scandinavian Airlines
 Swiss International Air Lines
 TAP Air Portugal
 TAROM
 Thai Airways International
 Ukraine International Airlines
 United Airlines

Fleet

Current fleet
, Austrian Airlines operates the following aircraft:

Historical fleet 
Over the years, Austrian Airlines operated the following aircraft types. Other aircraft types previously operated by the airline included the British Aerospace 146, Douglas DC-3, Hawker Siddeley HS 748 and Aero Commander (Grand Commander 680FL model).

Service

Austrian operates several lounges at its hub in Vienna. There are three Business, two Senator and two HON-Circle lounges. It also operates a Business lounge at Domodedovo International Airport in Moscow. In other cities, business class passengers are welcome to use Star Alliance business class lounges.

Do & Co has handled catering for Austrian Airlines since 2007. On long-haul flights, Business Class meals are prepared by a chef on board.

As of 2011 all Austrian planes of the Airbus A320 family are equipped with new seats and a new cabin design. By September 2013, Austrian's entire long-haul-fleet (Boeing 767 and Boeing 777) also got new seats and a new cabin design. It contains full-flat-beds with a pneumatics-system and aisle access from nearly every seat in Business Class, and new seats with video-on-demand for every passenger in Economy Class.

myAustrian Holidays 
Austrian myHoliday replaced Lauda Air as Austrian Airlines' holiday brand in April 2013 and was renamed into myAustrian Holidays in mid-2015. It operates seasonal charter flights at own risk and in co-operation with tour operators as well as exclusive ad hoc charter flights. All charter flights are operated by Austrian Airlines aircraft and crew. A Do & Co board service is served on all flights.

Seasonal holiday flights in 2017–18 were offered to 40 destinations in ten countries.

myAustrian Holidays flights cover a dedicated range of flight numbers:
 OS2000-OS2999: full charter flights & exclusive charter flights
 OS4000-OS4999 & OS9000-OS9999: seasonal holiday flights

Incidents and accidents
The following is a list of incidents and accidents involving Austrian Airlines mainline aircraft. It excludes occurrences with subsidiaries, such as Tyrolean Airways or Austrian Air Services.

 On 26 September 1960 at 21:40 local time, an Austrian Airlines Vickers Viscount (registered OE-LAF) crashed during approach of Sheremetyevo International Airport, killing 26 of the 31 passengers on board, as well as five of the six crew members. The aircraft had been operating Flight 901 from Vienna to Moscow with an intermediate stop at Warsaw. An altimeter malfunction was given as a probable cause for the only fatal accident for the airline to date.
 On 21 February 1970, a bomb explosion occurred in the cargo hold of an Austrian Airlines Sud Aviation Caravelle (registered OE-LCU) during a flight from Frankfurt to Vienna with 33 passengers and five crew on board, creating a hole in the fuselage. The pilots managed to return the aircraft safely to Frankfurt Airport. On the same day, another bomb had been planted on Swissair Flight 330, causing it to crash, killing 47 people. The Popular Front for the Liberation of Palestine claimed the responsibility for both assaults.
 On 7 January 1997, Austrian Airlines Flight 104 from Berlin to Vienna was hijacked by a Bosnian man who had forced his way into the cockpit armed with a knife (which was of a size small enough not to be banned from aeroplanes under regulations in force at the time). The pilots obeyed the perpetrator's demands to return to Berlin, so that he could negotiate with the local authorities over the renewal of his visa. Back at Berlin Tegel Airport, the McDonnell Douglas MD-87 was stormed by special police forces, and the hijacker was overpowered.
 On 5 January 2004 at 08:17 local time, an Austrian Airlines Fokker 70 (registered OE-LFO) crash-landed on a snow-covered field near Munich International Airport. The aircraft had been operating Flight 111 from Vienna to Munich, with 28 passengers and four crew on board, when its engines failed during landing descent due to icing. The aircraft was severely damaged, however only three passengers suffered minor injuries.

References

External links

 
 
 Austrian Airlines Group
 Austrian Airlines stock information
 Sportsclubs of Austrian Airlines
 Photo of OLAG F13 at Aspern

Airlines established in 1957
Airlines of Austria
Association of European Airlines members
Austrian brands
Austrian companies established in 1957
Lufthansa Group
Star Alliance